Crash Canyon is a Canadian adult animated sitcom which premiered on Teletoon at Night in Canada and was distributed globally by MTV. The show was first premiered on September 18, 2011 with the final episode aired on March 3, 2013.

Plot
It told the story of the community living at the bottom of a canyon. The Wendell family was looking for an original holiday by caravan but their trip ends sooner than expected at the bottom of a canyon in Alberta, Canada. The canyon walls are too high to climb and there is no way out. Soon they find out there is a whole community of 29 or 30 survivors from previous crashes down there. Dollars are not accepted and they use golf tees as a currency.

Development
Crash Canyon premiered on September 18, 2011. Joel Cohen, a Canadian expatriate living in Los Angeles while writing for The Simpsons, explained that creating an animated Canadian show with fellow expatriates would allow to write "jokes only hosers would get". He recruited ex-Canadian writers Tim Long of The Simpsons and Chuck Tatham of How I Met Your Mother to write scripts for the series. Co-producer and story editor Greg Lawrence explained that they have tried not to put too much emphasis on the family trying to escape the canyon. "It's not Gilligan's Island where every episode is: 'This week we're getting off the island.' But we do keep the sentiment alive, so as you move through the series there are attempts to get out and all fail."

In 2013, Teletoon released a press statement to Bubbleblabber stating that the network will not be moving forward with a 3rd season of the series. "Unfortunately a 3rd season of Crash Canyon is not in our plans at this time." The show ended on March 3, 2013.

Characters

Wendells
Norman "Norm" Wendell: Head of the family. An extremely rational engineer, he never loses his temper and is arguably the sanest person in the Canyon. He has very little social skill and often tries to solve his problems with science, only to fail.
Sheila Wendell: Norm's wife. She is easily enraged but also a very loving and caring mother and wife. She openly hates Vernon, Beverly and Angel.
Roxanne "Roxy" Wendell: The family's teenage daughter, she is consistently portrayed as extremely self-centered and selfish, and constantly complains about being stuck in the canyon. She does show occasional love for her family, but this is rare.
Jacob "Jake" Wendell: The family's son, a 10-year-old scam artist obsessed with making money through scams, gambling and fraud. He respects his father more than his sister does. Is often seen along with Sid's children Sly and Butch.
Vernon "Vern" Wendell: Norm's morbidly obese 3rd cousin who had accompanied the family on vacation. Vernon is enormously overweight and rides around on a mobility scooter. He's also an alcoholic. Vernon is mean, ill-tempered and stupid, making him one of the least liked inhabitants of the canyon. He lives out of the family's crashed minivan.

Butanes
Note: The entire hillbilly family speaks grammatical false English, and writes letters in false direction. Also, everyone of them is very dimwitted, bordering mental retardation. 
 
Sid: Former British punk rocker. His main hit was a song called "I Wanna Punch A Rainbow", which can be heard in some episodes. He obviously has a drug problem, and most of time talks about pointless things. He wears a safety pin in his nose and has 2 earrings on each side. He and his family ended up in the canyon after a plane crash.
Emily: Sid's wife. She is dimwitted, like the rest of her family, but seems to be more responsible to her children than her husband. She thinks French talking men are very romantic.
Mace: The family's love-sick teenage daughter. She desperately looks for a boyfriend (even going so far as to date animals or create one in her mind). She is friends with Roxy and Pristine, but only Roxy can hold the 3 together.
Sly (blonde) and Butch (brown): Perverse younger sons of the family. They have bad teeth and are extremely stupid, often endangering their lives because of it. They are friends (or rather, sidekicks) of Jake. They also seem to have an incestuous crush on their sister and each other; however, this can come from their dumbness.

Manderbelts
Reginald: Owner of Manderbelt Industries, husband of Beverly and father to Royce, Pristine and Vaughn. He is a very arrogant, selfish and snobbish man who often boasts about his wealth. He and his family wanted to move with their home (literally), but ended up in the canyon.
Beverly: The snobby matron of the family. She is as arrogant as her husband, and sometimes even more. She has a creepy crush on her son Royce, and she even bathes him.
Bjorn: The family's Norwegian servant, who never speaks (although it's never revealed why). It seems that he dates Frida sometimes. He has a very muscular build, and he does everything the family tell him to do, irrelevant of how bad or immoral it is. According to Reginald, he has to take the Manderbelt's behaviour because he is poor.
Princess: The family's 2-legged, disabled cat.
Royce: The family's son. Very handsome, he is Roxy's love interest until the 2nd season.
Pristine: The family's middle child and only daughter who is also a friend of Roxy. Unlike the other members of the family, Pristine is much less snobby and arrogant and rather kind and friendly towards the other inhabitants causing her to be regarded as ugly by the rest of her family, in spite of her nice appearance.
Vaughn: Youngest son and undefeated antagonist, he has anger issues. He does not say much aside from saying "I'm Vaughn". His parents do nothing to stop his aggressive behavior nor discipline him.

Charbonneaus
Angel: Mother/daughter team who tours the junior beauty pageant circuit. They, like the Manderbelts, are very arrogant, and sometimes even more. Despite the fact that Angel is manipulating and mischievous, she loves her daughter dearly and is very maternal towards her.
Brandi: Ruthless girl very spoiled and unlike Roxy, she only cares about herself.
Stéphane: Gay coach for Brandi's modelling. He acts like a stereotypical arrogant French man.

Other characters
Sarah Forbes: Ever optimist cheerleader. She acts as the mayor of Crash Canyon and has every time the presidency on every meeting. She is always happy and never seems to lose her nerves. She lives in a school bus. She also runs the canyon's school.
Nalappat Brajabashimayum and Dummy: An Indian-Canadian ventriloquist and his abusive dummy. He treats his dummy like a living being. Nalappat runs the only bar in the canyon, in which a strange drink made by himself is served. It is unknown what the recipe is but, according to him, it will get you drunk.
Frida Dominguez: A Latin-Canadian lady, she runs a restaurant with the lowest hygiene standards. She has been married countless times. She is a very sexually active person and has an affair with Bjorn.
Colton Steel and Private Lippy: Astronauts who ended up in the canyon when their capsule landed there after re-entry. Colton is a very patriotic astronaut, while Lippy has a crush on Roxy. They both are the best friends. He is the only one in the canyon with a US nationality.
Earl: A biker thug who ended up in the canyon after a friend from his group punched buggied him. He is very violent, but can be humorous sometimes. He has a large beard and red hair.
Hiko: An elderly Japanese-Canadian man, he talks like a stereotypical, fast-talking Asian. Most people in the canyon seem to never get that he is Japanese, as many believe him to be Chinese, Taiwanese or of other Asian descent, which angers him.
Mrs. Mcgurck and Bear: An abusive old lady who throws her insults and tortures at a brown bear (after she believed it ate her husband) and treats him like a slave. The bear takes it.
Pete and Carol: Ambulance attendants, most of the time they act very amoral and irresponsible for their occupation. They make many jokes. They ended up in the canyon after Pete let go of the wheel and they went off the road.
Coma Steve: Pete and Carol's patient who only lies on a stretcher. It is shown that Coma Steve is still aware of what happens around him, and occasionally comments on it, but is unable to move or speak. Before he fell into the canyon he had a perfect life (he was engaged, was about to become a father, and won 50 million dollars), but while trying to save a girl's kitten he dislocated his arm. When Pete and Carol drove him to the hospital, Pete got off of the road, falling into the canyon, causing Steve to fall into a coma. In the canyon, Pete and Carol treat him as an object.

One-time characters
Russel Mcgurck: Husband to the aforementioned widow. He appears in "Moose on the Loose". It turns out that he and his wife ended up in the Canyon after he attempted to suicide because of the constant insults of his wife. When he wanted to eat some honey, he took off his clothes because they were full of it. Once he came back, the bear was chewing on his clothes. Russel took the chance to go into the woods and live there, but he is later found by Norm and Jake. After a failed moose hunt, the moose kicks him from a cliff, and they believe that he is dead; at the end of the episode, however, it turns out that he is still alive and hiding from his wife. It is unclear if he would join the other Canyonites if they ever find a way to escape.
Cannonball Harris: He never actually appears in the series, Colton mentions him in the pilot episode. When trying to shoot himself out of the Canyon, he crashed on one of the canyon's walls and died. Due to this character, the fact that Sarah lives in a school bus and the presence of more vehicles than Canyonites, it is hinted that there were far more people who fell into the canyon, but they got lost or died.
Bobby Joe: Bobby Joe was a man who had a very bad life until he met the girl of his dreams Cathy, until he caught her cheating on him with a deceased man. Bobby Joe then had sex with a diseased primate, and caught the fatal Rametse virus, he then tried committing suicide by jumping into the canyon, after coming together as a community, the Canyonites throw Bobby Joe a proper funeral after he finally succumbs to death and is raped to death by Bear.
Robin Banks: A bank robber in the 1800s, who hid in the canyon along with his two accomplices (a monkey and a donkey). He sealed off the canyon with an impenetrable door that could only be opened with a donkey hoof and a monkeys paw. Unfortunately, Banks never made it back out of the canyon as his leg got stuck in a fire ant hill, and his other leg was eaten by a python. He left his diaries behind in case someone else ever ended up in the canyon.

Episodes
The show consists of 2 seasons, with the 1st season consisting of 18 episodes and the 2nd season consisting of 8 episodes. The episode order of the show as aired on Teletoon in Canada differs from that of airings in other countries.

Season 1 (2011-12)

Season 2 (2013)

Telecast and home media
The show was first premiered on Teletoon (part of "Teletoon at Night" block) in Canada from September 18, 2011 until the final episode's airing in March 2013. It was distributed globally by Viacom's MTV. In the U.S., the show was formerly aired on MAVTV.

References

External links

 Website
 Production website

2011 Canadian television series debuts
2013 Canadian television series endings
2010s Canadian adult animated television series
2010s Canadian sitcoms
Canadian adult animated comedy television series
Canadian animated sitcoms
Canadian flash animated television series
English-language television shows
Teletoon original programming
Television series by Breakthrough Entertainment
Television shows set in Alberta
Animated television series about dysfunctional families
Television series about vacationing